Ongwediva is a town in the Oshana Region in the north of Namibia. It is the district capital of the Ongwediva electoral constituency.  it had 27,000 inhabitants and covered 4,102 hectares of land. Ongwediva has seven churches, two private schools and 13 government-run schools. Most of the inhabitants speak Oshiwambo.

History
Ongwediwa started out as a Finnish mission station in 1926. A school for male students was built there at the time, focusing on practical skills. It is talked about as an agricultural and industrial school, although the agricultural emphasis soon faded away. The school started in February 1927, and it was a secondary school, which one could attend after completing primary school. Towards the end of the 1920s, the school started to receive subsidies from the South African government, although this was only a modest £100 per year.

The male teacher training seminary was transferred from Oniipa to Ongwediva at the end of 1954. It continues today as part of the Faculty of Education of the University of Namibia.

The civilian settlement of Ongwediva was established in the 1960s while Namibia was under South African occupation, in the area of headman Mr Nandjebo Mengela. Its purpose was to serve as a residential area for people employed by businesses and government in Oshakati and Ondangwa.

Economy and development
Ongwediva hosts an annual trade fair, the Ongwediva Annual Trade Fair (OATF) since 2000, after one initial trade fair, the Northern Namibia Trade Fair, was held in 1995. Opposite of the open market, there is a shopping mall (Maroela Mall, Mandume Ndemufayo St.).

Ongwediva is an urban area that experiences rapid growth. It had less than 11,000 inhabitants in 2001.

Ongwediva is the second largest entertainment town in Namibia just behind the capital Windhoek. Ongwediva is a fast-growing town in terms of development and status as a second most livable town in Namibia. It also features one of the few private hospitals in Namibia.

Politics
Ongwediva is governed by a town council that has seven seats.

Oshana Region, to which Ongwediva belongs, is a stronghold of Namibia's ruling SWAPO party. In the 2015 local authority election SWAPO won by a landslide (2,264 votes) and gained all seven council seats. The Rally for Democracy and Progress (RDP) also ran but gained only 166 votes. SWAPO also won the 2020 local authority election. It obtained 1,681 votes and gained four seats. The Independent Patriots for Change (IPC), an opposition party formed in August 2020, obtained 952 votes and gained three seats.

Education
There are currently only two high schools in Ongwediva, Mweshipandeka High School and Gabriel Taapopi SSS. There are also five primary schools. The newly created Faculty of Engineering and Information Technology of the University of Namibia is based in Ongwediva, and started its first official academic year in 2009. The José Eduardo dos Santos Campus is by far the largest physical development in Ongwediva. The Campus has already been described by the Namibian press as a Star in the North. There was also an educational college for teachers. The University of Namibia (Unam) Ongwediva Campus has been named after President Hifikepunye Pohamba. The campus was formally known as Ongwediva College of Education (OCE), and also got to be known as the Unam Ongwediva Campus when all colleges of education merged with Unam in 2010.

Notable residents 
 Benjamin Hauwanga, businessman, owner of Bennies Entertainment Park and Lodge and the BH Group of Companies
 Sunny Boy, hip hop and kwaito musician
 Erastus Uutoni, politician and former mayor of the town
 Benson Shilongo, football player for the Namibian national team.

Gallery

Sources

References

 
1926 establishments in South West Africa
Finnish Evangelical Lutheran Mission mission stations in Oukwanyama
Populated places in the Oshana Region
Populated places established in 1926
Towns in Namibia